The Chilean Socialist Party (Spanish: el Partido Socialista Chileno (PSCH)) was a political party in Chile, that self-identified as left-wing and which existed legally from 1988 to 1990. It has been claimed that it was formed as a tool for gathering support for the Pinochet dictatorship during its last years; the party used the traditional logo of the Socialist Party of Chile, a party then illegal. The leader of the party – Juan Carlos Moraga – has denied he formed the party to defend the dictatorship.

The party has been characterized as a "political Frankenstein" and a puerile attempt.

Sources and footnotes

′Defunct political parties in Chile
Political parties established in 1988
Political parties disestablished in 1990
1988 establishments in Chile
1990 disestablishments in Chile
Socialist parties in Chile